Haegiela is a genus of flowering plants in the family Asteraceae described as a genus in 1990. There is only one known species, Haegiela tatei, native to South Australia, and Victoria.

References

External links
Haegiela tatei occurrence data from the Australasian Virtual Herbarium

Gnaphalieae
Monotypic Asteraceae genera
Flora of South Australia
Taxa named by Paul G. Wilson
Taxa named by Philip Sydney Short
Flora of Victoria (Australia)